Pitama is a genus of moths of the family Crambidae.

Species
Pitama hermesalis (Walker, 1859)
Pitama lativitta Moore, 1888

References

Natural History Museum Lepidoptera genus database

Odontiinae
Crambidae genera
Taxa named by Frederic Moore